Charles Williams  is a former South African rugby union player who represented the Proteas against the All Blacks (1976).  He was also selected in 1979 for the South African Barbarians, the first multi-racial South African side to tour Britain.

On 4 June 1980 he was in the South African Country Districts XV team that lost 7-27 at South-West Stadium to the Lions on their tour of South Africa. Although selected as a replacement, Williams was brought on and scored the District's sole try. The Lions' team included Clive Woodward, John Robbie, and Gareth Davies.

References

South African rugby union players
Living people
Year of birth missing (living people)